La Romana may refer to:
 La Romana Province, Dominican Republic
 La Romana, Dominican Republic, capital city of the province 
La Romana International Airport
La Romana Men (volleyball club)
La Romana Women, volleyball club
 La Romana, Alicante, a village in Valencia, Spain
 Pedro Caro, 3rd Marquis of la Romana (1761–1811), Spanish general of the Peninsular War
Diego del Alcázar, 10th Marquis of la Romana (born 1950), Spanish entrepreneur
 The Woman of Rome (Italian: La Romana), a novel by Alberto Moravia
 "La Romana" (song), by Bad Bunny, 2018

See also

Romana (disambiguation)
Evacuation of La Romana's division, a military operation in 1808